Wooster is a city in Faulkner County, Arkansas, United States. The population was 860 at the 2010 census, up from 516 at the 2000 census. It is part of the Little Rock–North Little Rock–Conway Metropolitan Statistical Area.

Geography
Wooster is located in northwestern Faulkner County at  (35.200630, -92.453694). Arkansas Highway 25 passes through the city, leading northeast  to Greenbrier and south  to Conway, the county seat.

Demographics

2020 census

As of the 2020 United States census, there were 1,042 people, 352 households, and 310 families residing in the town.

2000 census
As of the census of 2000, there were 516 people, 200 households, and 154 families residing in the town.  The population density was 77.5/km (200.8/mi2).  There were 214 housing units at an average density of 32.2/km (83.3/mi2).  The racial makeup of the town was 97.29% White, 0.19% Black or African American, 0.78% Native American, 0.58% Asian, 0.58% from other races, and 0.58% from two or more races.  0.97% of the population were Hispanic or Latino of any race.

There were 200 households, out of which 33.5% had children under the age of 18 living with them, 64.0% were married couples living together, 10.0% had a female householder with no husband present, and 23.0% were non-families. 21.5% of all households were made up of individuals, and 11.0% had someone living alone who was 65 years of age or older.  The average household size was 2.58 and the average family size was 3.01.

In the town the population was spread out, with 23.4% under the age of 18, 7.8% from 18 to 24, 28.9% from 25 to 44, 26.9% from 45 to 64, and 13.0% who were 65 years of age or older.  The median age was 39 years. For every 100 females, there were 99.2 males.  For every 100 females age 18 and over, there were 98.5 males.

The median income for a household in the town was $35,063, and the median income for a family was $39,375. Males had a median income of $30,438 versus $24,063 for females. The per capita income for the town was $15,421.  About 4.5% of families and 9.0% of the population were below the poverty line, including 15.4% of those under age 18 and 9.7% of those age 65 or over.

Education 
Public education for elementary and secondary school students is primarily provided by the Greenbrier School District, beginning at the district's Wooster Elementary School and leading to graduation from Greenbrier High School.

References

Cities in Faulkner County, Arkansas
Cities in Arkansas
Cities in Little Rock–North Little Rock–Conway metropolitan area